Fastrack may refer to:

 Fastrack (bus), a bus rapid transit scheme in Kent, England
 Fastrack (fashion accessories), an Indian fashion accessory brand
 FasTrak, the electronic vehicle toll collection system used in California

See also
 Fast Track (disambiguation)
 Fastrac (disambiguation)